Shabiluy-e Sofla or Sheybluy-e Sofla, also rendered as Shabilu-ye Sofla and Shebilu-ye Sofla, may refer to:
 Shabiluy-e Sofla, Miandoab
 Sheybluy-e Sofla, Poldasht